Tugboat Annie is a 1933 American pre-Code film directed by Mervyn LeRoy, written by Norman Reilly Raine and Zelda Sears, and starring Marie Dressler and Wallace Beery as a comically quarrelsome middle-aged couple who operate a tugboat. Dressler and Beery were MGM's most popular screen team at that time, having recently made the bittersweet Min and Bill (1930) together, for which Dressler won the Academy Award for Best Actress.

The boisterous Tugboat Annie character first appeared in a series of stories in the Saturday Evening Post written by the author Norman Reilly Raine which were supposedly based on the life of Thea Foss of Tacoma, Washington. There is also a theory that her character is loosely based on Kate A. Sutton, secretary and dispatcher for the Providence Steamboat Company during the 1920s.

Tugboat Annie also features Robert Young and Maureen O'Sullivan as the requisite pair of young lovers. Captain Clarence Howden piloted Annie's tugboat "Narcissus" (real name Wallowa), which was owned by Foss Tug and Barge of Tacoma and had been leased to MGM for the film. Howden's son Richard Howden is seen rolling rope during the credits.

Filmed in Seattle, Washington, Tugboat Annie used local residents as extras, including then-mayor John F. Dore. The tugboat used in the film, renamed Arthur Foss in 1934, is the oldest wooden tugboat afloat in the world and remains preserved by Northwest Seaport in Seattle.

Cast

Reception
The film earned $1,917,000 in rentals in the United States and Canada and $655,000 overseas for a total of $2,572,000
and made a profit of $1.1 million.

Sequels
A sequel called Tugboat Annie Sails Again was released in 1940, starring Marjorie Rambeau, Alan Hale, Jane Wyman, and Ronald Reagan, and another called Captain Tugboat Annie in 1945 starring Jane Darwell and Edgar Kennedy. Many of the publicity shots for the former were taken aboard the Arthur Foss, which had starred as Annie's "Narcissus" in the original film.

A Canadian-filmed television series appeared in 1957, The Adventures of Tugboat Annie, starring Minerva Urecal ran for 39 half-hour episodes.

References in other media

 In The Railway Series book, The Twin Engines, Gordon the Big Engine references Tugboat Annie when he teases Donald and Douglas about their deep-toned whistles.
 The character is mentioned in the AA "Big Book" in the personal story of Dr. Bob, one of the co-founders of Alcoholics Anonymous.
 1990s indie rock band Tugboat Annie was named for the character.

References

External links
 
 

1933 films
American black-and-white films
1933 comedy-drama films
Films directed by Mervyn LeRoy
1930s English-language films
Metro-Goldwyn-Mayer films
Tugboats in fiction
Films produced by Irving Thalberg
Seafaring films
American comedy-drama films
1930s American films